FC Sibiryak Bratsk was a Russian football club from Bratsk, founded in 1967 and dissolved in 2014. It played professionally in 1967-1970, 1972–1973, 1976–1978 and from 1998 to 2013/14. Second Division is the highest level they ever achieved. The club was called Pursey Bratsk (1967–1969), Energiya Bratsk (1976–1995) and Lesokhimik Bratsk (1996).

External links
Official Website

Association football clubs established in 1967
Association football clubs disestablished in 2014
Defunct football clubs in Russia
Sport in Irkutsk Oblast
1967 establishments in Russia